George John Faust (September 28, 1917 – May 28, 1993) was an American football player who played one season with the Chicago Cardinals of the National Football League (NFL). He was drafted by the Chicago Cardinals in the sixth round of the 1939 NFL Draft. He played college football at the University of Minnesota and attended North Community High School in Minneapolis, Minnesota.

References

External links
 Just Sports Stats
 

1917 births
1993 deaths
American football quarterbacks
Chicago Cardinals players
Minnesota Golden Gophers football players
Jacksonville Naval Air Station Flyers football players
People from Parkston, South Dakota
Players of American football from South Dakota
North Community High School alumni